New Zealand competed at the 2017 World Aquatics Championships in Budapest, Hungary from 14 to 30 July.

Diving

New Zealand entered 3 divers (one male and two female).

Men

Women

Mixed

Open water swimming

New Zealand entered one open water swimmer

Swimming

New Zealand swimmers have achieved qualifying standards in the following events (up to a maximum of 2 swimmers in each event at the A-standard entry time, and 1 at the B-standard):

Men

Women

Synchronized swimming

New Zealand's synchronized swimming team consisted of 3 athletes (3 female).

Women

Water polo

New Zealand qualified a women's team.

Women's tournament

Team roster

Jessica Milicich
Nicole Lewis
Kelly Mason
Ricci Ferigo
Alexandra Boyd (C)
Bernadette Doyle
Emmerson Houghton
Caitlin Lopes da Silva
Emma Stoneman
Casie Bowry
Kirsten Hudson
Brydie Pye
Antonia Young

Group play

Playoffs

9th–12th place semifinals

Eleventh place game

References

Nations at the 2017 World Aquatics Championships
New Zealand at the World Aquatics Championships
2017 in New Zealand sport